Srikant Datar is an Indian-American economist and the Dean of Harvard Business School. At Harvard, he concurrently serves as the Arthur Lowes Dickinson Professor of Business Administration. In 2021, he was awarded the Padma Shri, the fourth-highest civilian award in India.

Early life 
Datar attended the Cathedral and John Connon School in Mumbai. He graduated with distinction in mathematics and economics from St. Xavier's College, University of Mumbai in 1973. At IIM Ahmedabad, he was a gold medalist and the General Secretary of the Student's Council (1977–78). He is a chartered accountant and holds two master's degrees and a doctorate from Stanford University.

Career
Since 2015, he has been faculty chair of the Harvard Innovation Labs and Senior Associate Dean for University Affairs at Harvard Business School. He is a member of the boards of directors of ICF International, Stryker Corporation, and T-Mobile US, all in the US, and of IIM Calcutta. He previously served on the boards of IIM Ahmedabad, HCL Technologies (2012 to 2014) and KPIT Technologies (2007 to 2012), both based in India. Datar is also part of the governing body of S. P. Jain Institute of Management and Research.

Datar has worked as an accountant and planner in industry and as a professor at Carnegie Mellon University, Stanford University, and Harvard University. His research interests are in the areas of cost management, measurement of productivity, governance, new product development, innovation, time-based competition, incentives, and performance evaluation. He is the author of many publications and has received several academic awards and honors. In 2021, he was the winner of the 2021 Bharat Asmita Acharya Shreshtha Award from Maharashtra Academy of Engineering and Education Research (MAEER) and in 2020 he was honored as the 2020 Public Company Director of the Year by the National Association of Corporate Directors (NACD).  

Datar has also advised numerous companies in research, development, and training.

References

Bibliography

Year of birth missing (living people)
Living people
Harvard Business School faculty
American economists
St. Xavier's College, Mumbai alumni
Indian Institute of Management Ahmedabad alumni
Stanford University alumni
Recipients of the Padma Shri in literature & education
American people of Indian descent
American university and college faculty deans